Events in the year 1923 in Germany.

Incumbents

National level
President
Friedrich Ebert (Social Democrats)
Chancellor
Wilhelm Cuno (Non-partisan) to 12 August, then from 13 August Gustav Stresemann (German People's Party) to 30 November, then Wilhelm Marx (1st term) (Centre)

Events
 11 January – French and Belgian troops enter the Ruhr in the Occupation of the Ruhr because of Germany’s refusal to pay war reparations, causing strikes and a severe economic crisis.
 20 April – Julius Streicher's antisemitic newspaper Der Stürmer begins publication.
 13 August – The First Stresemann cabinet was sworn in.
 15 September – Germany's bank rate is raised to 90% due to hyperinflation. See 1920s German inflation.
 26 September:
 Chancellor Gustav Stresemann calls for an end to passive resistance and protests by Germans against the French and Belgian Occupation of the Ruhr.
 The German government declares a state of emergency under Article 48 of the German Weimar Constitution. It will last until February 1924.
 6 October – The Second Stresemann cabinet was sworn in.
 21 October – A separatist government is formed in the Rhineland Palatinate and is quickly recognized by the French government.
 9 November – Members of the National Socialist German Workers Party (Nazis), led by Adolf Hitler, fail in a coup attempt to overthrow the Bavarian government in Munich, Germany which is later known as the Munich Putsch or Beer Hall Putsch.
 15 November – The value of the German Papiermark falls to 4.2 mark to the United States dollar causing the German government to issue the Rentenmark as a replacement for the Papiermark to alleviate the hyperinflation in the Weimar Republic.
 23 November – Gustav Stresemann resigns as German Chancellor after a vote of no confidence from members of the government.
 30 November – The First Marx cabinet was sworn in.
 1 December – Centre Party member Wilhelm Marx forms a new coalition government becoming the new German Chancellor.
 8 December:
 Germany signs an economic treaty with the United States.
 The Reichstag passes an enabling act empowering the government to take all measures it deems necessary and urgent with regard to the state of emergency.

Popular culture

Arts and literature
Hermann Oberth publishes Die Rakete zu den Planetenraumen (The Rocket into Interplanetary Space)

Art
Max Beckmann made a self-portrait of himself holding a cigarette. The painting is currently housed at the Museum of Modern Art in New York.

Wassily Kandinsky painted his Composition VIII while he was working at the Bauhaus school of art in Weimar. This completely non-representational work exemplifies his ground-breaking movement toward abstraction.

Births
 8 January – Joseph Weizenbaum, German computer scientist (died 2008)
 11 January – Ernst Nolte, German historian (died 2016)
 16 January – Anton-Günther, Duke of Oldenburg (died 2014)
 17 January – Horst E. Brandt, German film director (died 2009)
 19 January
 Hellmut Lange, German actor (died 2011)
 Markus Wolf, German head of the Main Directorate for Reconnaissance (died 2006)
 9 February – Heinz Drache, German actor (died 2002)
 10 March – Hans Riegel, German entrepreneur (died 2013)
 15 March – Willy Semmelrogge, German actor (died 1984)
 25 March – Reimar Lüst, German astrophysicist
 26 March – Gert Bastian, German politician (died 1992)
 22 April – Gero Wecker, German film producer (died 1974)
 23 April – Reinhart Koselleck, German historian (died 2006)
 23 May – Walter Wolfrum German World War II Luftwaffe fighter ace (died 2010)
 26 May – Horst Tappert, German actor (died 2008)
 27 May – Henry A. Kissinger, German-born United States presidential advisor
 2 June – Margot Trooger, German actress (died 1994)
 9 June – Gerald Götting, German politician (died 2015)
 10 June – Georg Moser, German bishop of Roman-Catholic Church (died 1988)
 14 June – Judith Kerr, German-born British writer and illustrator (died 2019)
 7 August – Liane Berkowitz, German resistance fighter of the Red Orchestra organisation (died 1943)
 26 August – Wolfgang Sawallisch, German conductor (died 2013)
 10 September – Uri Avnery, German-born Israeli writer and founder of the Gush Shalom peace movement
 20 October – Otfried Preußler, German writer (died 2013)
 21 October – Erna de Vries,  German Holocaust survivor (died 2021)
 22 October – Bert Trautmann, German footballer and goalkeeper (died 2013)
 4 November – Harry Valérien, German sports journalist (died 2012)
 5 November – Rudolf Augstein, German journalist (died 2002)
 12 November – Vicco von Bülow, German comedian, humorist, cartoonist, film director, actor and writer (died 2011)
 15 November – Rüdiger von Wechmar, German diplomat (died 2007)
 22 November – Hanna Maron, German-born Israeli actress
 15 December:
 Uzi Gal, German-born Israeli gun designer, best remembered as the designer and namesake of the Uzi submachine gun (died 2002)
 Inge Keller, German actress (died 2017)
 17 December – Jürgen Ponto, German bankier (died 1977)
 25 December – Sonia Olschanezky, German-born French Jewish World War II heroine (executed by German) (died 1944

Deaths
 1 February – Ernst Troeltsch, theologian and philosopher (born 1865)
 3 February – Siegmund Guenther, German geographer, historian and naturalist (born 1848)
 6 February – Gerdt von Bassewitz, German playwright and actor (born 1878)
 10 February – Wilhelm Conrad Röntgen, physicist (born 1845)
 11 February – Helmuth von Maltzahn, German politician (born 1840)
 22 February – Princess Marie Elisabeth of Saxe-Meiningen, German composer (born 1853)
 23 April – Princess Louise of Prussia (born 1838)
 24 April – William Ernest, Grand Duke of Saxe-Weimar-Eisenach (born 1876)
 11 March – Karl von Müller, German German Imperial captain (born 1873)
 3 May – Ernst Hartwig, German astronomer (born 1851)
 17 May – Duke Paul Frederick of Mecklenburg (born 1852)
 21 May –  Hans Goldschmidt, German chemist (born 1861)
 5 June – Carl von Horn, German general  (born 1847)
 20 June –  Princess Marie of Battenberg, German writer and translator (born 1852 in France)
 12 July – Ernst Otto Beckmann, German chemist and pharmacist (born 1853)
 4 September – Paul Friedländer, German chemist (born 1857)
 29 September – Walther Penck, German geologist and geomorphologist (born 1888)
 3 November – Carl Harries, German chemist (born 1866)
 9 November – Theodor von der Pfordten, Nazi paramilitary (born 1873)
 14 November – Ernest Augustus, Crown Prince of Hanover (born 1845)
 16 November – Guido Herzfeld, German actor (born 1851)
 20 November – Rudolf Havenstein, German lawyer and president of the Reichsbank (born 1857)
 17 December – Paul von Krause, German politician and jurist (born 1852)

References 

 
Years of the 20th century in Germany
Germany
Germany